Rough Cutt Live is a live album by the American heavy metal  band Rough Cutt. The live album contains three new studio tracks.

Track listing
"Let 'em Talk" – 3:46
"Bad Reputation" – 4:45
"We Like It Loud" – 4:15
"Double Trouble" – 3:22
"Black Widow" – 4:44
"Take Her" – 3:57
"Dreamin' Again" – 5:27
"Dressed to Kill" – 4:11
"Cutt Your Heart Out" / "Rock the USA" – 2:27
"Piece of My Heart" – 6:52
"House of Pain" (studio track) – 4:15
"Prowler" (studio track) – 6:03
"Peyote" (studio track) – 6:47

Line–Up
Paul Shortino – lead vocals
Amir Derakh – guitar
Chris Hager – guitar
Matt Thorr – bass
Dave Alford – drums

References

Rough Cutt albums
1996 live albums